The Children's HIV Association (CHIVA) is a British charity which supports children, young people and families living with HIV.

The charity's aims are:
 Enhance the health and social outcomes for children, young people and families living with HIV
 Reduce the isolation of children and young people living with HIV
 Ensure the voices of children, young people and families living with HIV are present in service and practice development
 Reduce the stigma faced by children, young people and families living with HIV
 Facilitate knowledge about HIV and thus empower young people with HIV to become more independent.

In 2008 it worked with the British Medical Association to publish a joint set of guidelines for the management of HIV in pregnant women.

It was one of the seven charities nominated by Prince Harry and Meghan Markle to receive donations in lieu of wedding presents when the couple married on 19 May 2018.

References

External links
 
 

Children's charities based in the United Kingdom
Health charities in the United Kingdom
HIV/AIDS organisations in the United Kingdom